The 1876 United States presidential election in Tennessee took place on November 7, 1876, as part of the 1876 United States presidential election. Tennessee voters chose twelve representatives, or electors, to the Electoral College, who voted for president and vice president.

Tennessee was won by Samuel J. Tilden, the former governor of New York (D–New York), running with Thomas A. Hendricks, the governor of Indiana and future vice president, with 59.79% of the popular vote, against Rutherford B. Hayes, the governor of Ohio (R-Ohio), running with Representative William A. Wheeler, with 40.21% of the vote.

This election was the last when the Unionist Highland Rim counties of Henderson and Wayne voted for a Democratic Presidential candidate.

Results

References 

Tennessee
1876
1876 Tennessee elections